The COVID-19 pandemic in Kuala Lumpur started when a Chinese male national from Wuhan in the province of Hubei tested positive on 3 February 2020. As of 10 July, Kuala Lumpur confirmed 2,445 cases and 18 fatalities.

Statistics

Details of death cases in Kuala Lumpur

Timeline

February 2020
On 3 February, Kuala Lumpur recorded its first case of infection: a 63-year-old Chinese male national. He arrived in Kuala Lumpur International Airport (KLIA) from Xiamen of Fujian Province on 18 January with his family. He developed mild fever on 23 January, and was admitted to Kuala Lumpur Hospital (HKL). He was tested positive on 3 February. He wasn't given any antiviral drugs for treatment.

On 5 February, another case was recorded: a 37-year-old Chinese female national. She arrived in Kuala Lumpur International Airport with her mother and three friends on 25 January, and toured around the city. On 1 February, she sought treatment at HKL after having slight fever. The doctor allowed her to go home to rest after prescribing the medicine, but order her and her group to stay indoors and isolate. Health officials continued to monitor the woman and found that her condition persisted until 5 February, where she was referred to HKL and diagnosed at the same day.

References

Kuala Lumpur
History of Kuala Lumpur
2020s in Kuala Lumpur